Solveig Josefine Kristina Rybrink (born 19 January 1998) is a Swedish footballer who plays as a defender for the Damallsvenskan team BK Häcken. Rybrink made her debut for the Sweden women's national football team in February 2021.

Club career
Rybrink transferred to Kristianstads on a two-year contract in November 2017, after a successful three-year spell with Kungsbacka.

In November 2021, Rybrink joined BK Häcken on a contract until the end of 2024.

International career
On 19 February 2021 Rybrink made her senior Sweden debut, in a 6–1 friendly win over Austria in Paola, Malta. She was a 78th-minute substitute for Nilla Fischer.

References

External links
Profile  at Swedish Football Association (SvFF)

1998 births
Living people
Swedish women's footballers
Sweden women's international footballers
Damallsvenskan players
Women's association football defenders
Kungsbacka DFF players
Kristianstads DFF players
BK Häcken FF players
People from Kristianstad Municipality
Footballers from Skåne County